San Antonio station is a Caltrain commuter rail station located in Mountain View, California. The station has two side platforms serving the two tracks of the Peninsula Subdivision, with a pedestrian tunnel at the south end.

References

External links

Caltrain - San Antonio station

Caltrain stations in Santa Clara County, California
Railway stations in Mountain View, California
Railway stations in the United States opened in 1999